HRT 2 (HTV 2, "Drugi program") is a Croatian free-to-air television channel, operated by Hrvatska Radiotelevizija (HRT). Its line-up focuses mainly on entertainment, although it also broadcasts news and documentaries. A new broadcast of HRT2, HRT2 No Latency was launched on the 20th of November 2022, available only on the HRTi streaming service, following the opening of the 2022 FIFA World Cup. The channel will be closed down at the end of the World Cup. HRT2 Low Latency airs the same programs as HRT2, without the ability to pause and rewind.

Current line-up

News shows
Regionalni Dnevnik – news from Croatia's major cities

Croatian soap operas
Obični ljudi ("Regular People")

Entertainment
 VIP Music Club (music show)
 Žutokljunac (children's programme)
 Art Attack (children's programme)
 Odmori se, zaslužio si (Croatian family sitcom)
 Luda kuća (Croatian sitcom)
 Volim nogomet (Croatian football league)
 Na kraju ulice (children's programme)
 Žuti marker (cronicle jurnal's programme)
 Bitange i princeze (Croatian sitcom)

Foreign series
 Star Trek: The Original Series – Croatian: Zvjezdane staze
 Star Trek: The Next Generation – Zvjezdane staze: Slijedeća generacija
 Star Trek: Deep Space Nine – Zvjezdane staze: Deep Space Nine
 Star Trek: Voyager – Zvjezdane staze: Voyager
 Star Trek: Enterprise – Zvjezdane staze: Enterprise
 Battlestar Galactica – Galactica
 Stargate: Universe – Zvjezdana vrata: Svemir
 Doctor Who
 House M.D. – Dr House
 My Name Is Earl – Zovem se Earl
 Ugly Betty – Ružna Betty
 CSI: Crime Scene Investigation
 24
 Ally McBeal
 Friends – Prijatelji
 One Tree Hill – Tree Hill
 Lie to Me – Laži mi
 The Suite Life of Zack & Cody – Lagodan život Zacka i Codyja
 Dear John – Dragi John
 The Triplets - Vesele Trojke
 Pastewka - Pastewka
 My Little Pony: Friendship Is Magic - Moj mali poni: Prijateljstvo je čarobno
 Matt Hatter Chronicles - Kronike Matta Hattera
 Dinosaur Train - Vlak Dinosaura
 Sarah and Duck - Sara i Patka
 Twirlywoos - Vrtuljići
 Teletubbies - Teletabisi
 Fireman Sam - Vatrogasac Sam
 Dipdap - Tuc Muc
 Go Jetters - Naprijed, Go Jetteri

Documentaries and talk shows
 Parlaonica – teenage talk show
 Slikovnica – special show featuring old recordings from HRT
 Na rubu znanosti – science talk show
 Briljanteen – teen/children's talk show

Comedy series
 Zakon ("Law")
 Bitange i princeze ("Scoundrels and Princesses")
 Odmori se zaslužio si ("Relax, You Deserve It")
 Naši i vaši ("Ours and Yours")

Sports
 UEFA Europa League
 UEFA Europa Conference League

Coming Soon

Cartoons 

 Molly of Denali (TBA)
 Clifford the Big Red Dog (Veliki crveni pas Clifford)

Previously on HRT2

Foreign series
 Seks i grad – Sex And The City
 Dosjei X – The X Files
 Stari Rim – Rome
 Simpsoni – The Simpsons
 Zvjezdane staze – Star Trek
 Sunset beach – Sunset Beach
 Svijet slavnih – Celebridade
 Parovi – Coupling

Telenovelas

 Moć sudbine - La Fuerza del Destino
 Prkosna ljubav - Amor Bravío

Entertainment 
 Volim nogomet
 Putna groznica (quiz show)
 Vip Music Club LP (music chart show)
 Hit depo (music chart show)
 Pravo vrijeme (music chart show)
 Kruške i jabuke (Ready Steady Cook)
 Garaža (live concert show)
 Veliki odmor (school programme)

Cartoons

Currently as of October 3, 2018 

 Pippi Longstocking (1997 TV series)
 Little Red Tractor
 64 Zoo Lane
 The Adventures of Paddington Bear
 Miffy and Friends

Former cartoons before October 3, 2018 

 Pat and Mat (moved to RTL Kockica by September 2018)
 Tom and Jerry Kids
 Caillou (moved to RTL Kockica)
 Animaniacs
 Nora Fora

Logo history

External links
Official website

Note

References 

Television channels in Croatia
Television channels and stations established in 1972
Croatian-language television stations